Marine Fighter Attack Squadron 334 (VMFA-334) was a United States Marine Corps fighter squadron.  Known as the “Falcons”, it was part of Marine Aircraft Group 15 and Marine Aircraft Group 33.  The squadron participated in action during World War II and the Vietnam War and was decommissioned in 1971.

History

Early years

Marine Scout Bomber Squadron 334 (VMSB-334) was commissioned on August 1, 1943 at Marine Corps Air Station Cherry Point flying the Douglas SBD Dauntless.  The squadron traveled around the United States for a year training until it was decommissioned on October 10, 1944, a day that many other scout bomber squadrons were deactivated.

Post World War II years
Marine Attack Squadron 334 (VMA-334) was reactivated on May 31, 1952 at Marine Corps Air Station Miami as part of the general increase in the United States military brought on by the Korean War.  At this time they were equipped with the F6F Hellcat, later with the F4U Corsair, then the F9F Panther.  Less than two years later, on January 23, 1954, the squadron transitioned to the FJ Fury and was redesignated Marine Fighter Squadron 334 {VMF-334}.

VMF-334’s first overseas deployment came in early 1957 when it was sent to Naval Air Station Atsugi for more than a year.  The squadron returned to Marine Corps Air Station El Toro in January 1958 where it became the first West Coast squadron to transition to the F8U-1 Crusader.

Vietnam War
The Falcons were re-designated Marine Fighter Attack Squadron 334 (VMFA-334) on August 1, 1967 and again transitioned airframes to the F-4J Phantom II. The Falcons departed MCAS El Toro on August 20, 1968. The squadron arrived at Da Nang Air Base on September 1 and combat operations began almost immediately. VMFA-334 relocated to Chu Lai early in 1969. VMFA-334 remained in Vietnam until September 1969 when they were relocated to Marine Corps Air Station Iwakuni, Japan.

In March 1971 VMFA-334 returned to MCAS El Toro and was decommissioned later that year on December 30, 1971.

See also

 United States Marine Corps Aviation
 List of active United States Marine Corps aircraft squadrons
 List of decommissioned United States Marine Corps aircraft squadrons

Citations

References

Bibliography

 

Web

 Crusader in Navy/Marine Corps service
 Marine Gunfighters
 Gator!
 Marine Flying Units

Fighter attack squadrons of the United States Marine Corps
Inactive units of the United States Marine Corps